Jewish Golden Age
Golden age of Jews in Poland (13th-17th century)
Golden age of Jews in Spain (8th-12th century)